Artsyom Pyatrenka (born 1 March 2000) is a Belarusian professional footballer who plays for Slavia Mozyr.

References

External links 
 
 
 Profile at Slavia Mozyr website

2000 births
Living people
Belarusian footballers
Association football forwards
FC Slavia Mozyr players
FC Rukh Brest players